The 2020–21 UAB Blazers basketball team represented the University of Alabama at Birmingham during the 2020–21 NCAA Division I men's basketball season. The Blazers, led by first-year head coach Andy Kennedy, played their home games at the Bartow Arena as members of Conference USA.

Offseason

Departures

Incoming transfers

Roster

Schedule and results
 
|-
!colspan=9 style=|Regular season

|-
!colspan=9 style=| Conference USA tournament

Source

See also
 2020–21 UAB Blazers women's basketball team

Notes

References

UAB Blazers men's basketball seasons
UAB
UAB
UAB